Frontier justice usually refers to extrajudicial punishment that is motivated by the nonexistence of law and order or dissatisfaction with justice.

Frontier Justice may also refer to:
Frontier Justice (film) a 1935 film
Frontier Justice (TV series), a 1950s–60s CBS television series
Frontier Justice (book), a 2003 book

See also
Summary justice (disambiguation)
Vigilantism